The 1947 West Virginia Mountaineers football team was an American football team that represented West Virginia University as an independent during the 1947 college football season. In its fifth season under head coach Bill Kern, the team compiled a 6–4 record and outscored opponents by a total of 252 to 84. The team played its home games at Mountaineer Field in Morgantown, West Virginia. Eugene Corum was the team captain. The team played its home games at Mountaineer Field in Morgantown, West Virginia.

Schedule

References

West Virginia
West Virginia Mountaineers football seasons
West Virginia Mountaineers football